Freidbergia mirabilis is a species of tephritid or fruit flies in the genus Freidbergia of the family Tephritidae.

Distribution
Ethiopia, Kenya, Uganda, Tanzania.

References

Tephritinae
Insects described in 1999
Diptera of Africa